The Diocese of Jericó is a Latin Church ecclesiastical territory or diocese of the Catholic Church in Western Colombia. It is a suffragan diocese in the ecclesiastical province of the metropolitan Archdiocese of Medellín.

History 
 29 January 1915: Established as Diocese of Jericó, on territory split off from the Metropolitan Archdiocese of Medellin
 5 February 1917: Suppressed, its territory and title being merged into the then Diocese of Antioquia-Jericó (now Archdiocese of Santa Fe de Antioquia)
 3 July 1941: Restored as Diocese of Jericó, regaining its territory from the above Diocese of Antioquía–Jericó.

Statistics 
, it pastorally served 262,951 Catholics (98.1% of 268,000 total population) on 3,000 km² in 33 parishes and 35 missions with 76 priests (diocesan), 2 deacons, 106 lay religious (106 sisters) and 25 seminarians.

Special churches 
 Its cathedral is the Catedral de Nuestra Señora de las Mercedes, dedicated to Our Lady of Mercy, in the episcopal see of Jericó, in the Colombian department of Antioquia
 It further has a Minor Basilica (also Marian) : Basilica of the Immaculate Conception, at Jardín

Bishops

Ordinaries
Suffragan Bishops of Jericó 
 Apostolic Administrator Maximiliano Crespo Rivera (1915 – 7 Feb 1917), while Bishop of Antioquía (1911.10.10 – 1917.02.05); next Bishop of Santa Rosa de Osos (Colombia) (1917.02.07 – 1923.11.15), Metropolitan Archbishop of Popayán (Colombia) (1923.11.15 – death 1940.11.07)
 See merged into the diocese of Antioquia (1917–1941)
 Antonio José Jaramillo Tobón (7 Feb 1942 – retired 31 March 1960), emeritate as Titular Archbishop of Cotrada (1960.03.31 – death 1969.04.27)
 Augusto Trujillo Arango † (31 Mar 1960 – 20 Feb 1970), next Metropolitan Archbishop of Tunja (Colombia) (1970.02.20 – retired 1998.02.02), died 2007; previously Titular Bishop of Nisyrus (1957.04.25 – 1960.03.31) as Auxiliary Bishop of Manizales (Colombia) (1957.04.25 – 1960.03.31)
 Juan Eliseo Mojica Oliveros (4 June 1970 – 26 April 1977), next Bishop of Garagoa (Colombia) (1977.04.26 – death 1989.12.27); previously Titular Bishop of Baliana (1967.02.20 – 1970.06.04) as Auxiliary Bishop of Archdiocese of Tunja (Colombia) (1967.02.20 – 1970.06.04)
 Augusto Aristizábal Ospina (29 Oct 1977 – retired 7 Oct 2003) died 2004; previously Titular Bishop of Ceramussa (1969.06.02 – 1977.10.29) as Auxiliary Bishop of Archdiocese of Cali (Colombia) (1969.06.02 – 1977.10.29)
 José Roberto López Londoño (7 Oct 2003 – retired June 2013); previously Titular Bishop of Urbisaglia (1982.05.24 – 1987.05.09) as Auxiliary Bishop of Archdiocese of Medellin (Colombia) (1982.05.24 – 1987.05.09), Bishop of Armenia (Colombia) (1987.05.09 – 2003.10.07)
 Noel Londoño Antonio Buitrago, Redemptorist (C.SS.R.) (10 August 2013– ...), also Apostolic Commissioner of Sodalitium of Christian Life (2018.01.10 – ...).

Other priest of this diocese who became bishop
José Luis Henao Cadavid, appointed Bishop of Líbano-Honda in 2015

See also 
 List of Catholic dioceses in Colombia
 Roman Catholicism in Colombia

References

Sources and External links 
 GCatholic.org, with Google map & satellite HQ picture - data for all sections
 Catholic Hierarchy

Roman Catholic dioceses in Colombia
Roman Catholic Ecclesiastical Province of Medellín
Religious organizations established in 1941
Roman Catholic dioceses and prelatures established in the 20th century
1915 establishments in Colombia
1941 establishments in Colombia